Dario Špikić (born 22 March 1999) is a Croatian footballer who plays as a forward for Dinamo Zagreb.

References

External links
 

1999 births
Living people
Footballers from Zagreb
Association football wingers
Croatian footballers
Croatia youth international footballers
Croatia under-21 international footballers
GNK Dinamo Zagreb II players
HNK Hajduk Split players
HNK Hajduk Split II players
HNK Gorica players
GNK Dinamo Zagreb players
First Football League (Croatia) players
Croatian Football League players